Dr. Ville Friman (born April 30, 1980) is a Finnish musician. He is one of the founders, main composer, and guitarist of the melodic death metal band Insomnium. Although Insomnium is his main band, he also plays guitar for the dark/thrash/black-metal band Arrival and bass guitar for melodeath act Enter My Silence. Friman has a PhD in evolutionary ecology from the Helsinki University, and is a Research Associate in that field at the University of York, UK.

References

External links 
 www.insomnium.net
 
 
 

1980 births
Living people
Finnish guitarists
Finnish male guitarists
Finnish heavy metal musicians
Seven-string guitarists
Academics of the University of York
21st-century guitarists
21st-century male musicians
Insomnium members
Finnish phytopathologists